Windsor is a town in Bertie County, North Carolina, United States. The population was 3,630 at the 2010 census, up from 2,283 in 2000. It is the county seat of Bertie County, which is also the homeland of the Southern Band Tuscarora Tribe that remained in North Carolina post Colonialism.  Windsor is located in North Carolina's Inner Banks region.

History
The land was historically the home of the Tuscarora people. Today, there are Tuscarora residents living in the village of Tandequemuc, now called Merry Hill.

Bertie County Courthouse, Bertie Memorial Hospital, Elmwood, Freeman Hotel, Hope Plantation, Jordan House, King House, Liberty Hall, Rosefield, and Windsor Historic District are listed on the National Register of Historic Places.

In the early morning hours of August 4, 2020, an EF3 tornado spawned by Hurricane Isaias struck areas just outside of Windsor. The twister obliterated 12 mobile homes within a mobile home park outside of town, and flattened another poorly built house. The tornado killed 2 people and injured 14 others. The tornado would the strongest tropical cyclone spawned tornado since 2005. Governor Roy Cooper toured the damage area in the days following the event.

Recreation 
Windsor is a notable Inner Banks kayaking destination. Canoes and kayaks are offered, by the Town of Windsor and the Roanoke Cashie River Center to use on the generally calm waters of the Cashie River.

Town of Windsor Parks and Recreation Department Facilities 
Livermon Park and Mini Zoo
Cashie Wetlands Walk and Canoe Trail
Craftsman and Farmers Museum
Hoggard Mill Road Bridge Access
Cashie River Campground
Cashie Disk Golf Course
Cashie River Tree Houses

Windsor Tennis Courts
Rotary Park
Tuscarora village of Tandequemuc Longhouse
Williford Park
Cashie River ADAAG Fishing Piers and ADAAG Small Boat Launch and Trail

Geography
Windsor is located at  (35.998145, -76.948973).

Demographics

2020 census

As of the 2020 United States census, there were 3,582 people, 1,018 households, and 641 families residing in the town.

2000 census
As of the census of 2000, there were 2,283 people, 938 households, and 605 families residing in the town. The population density was 925.6 people per square mile (356.9/km). There were 1,080 housing units at an average density of 437.9 per square mile (168.8/km). The racial makeup of the town was 52.96% African American, 45.42% White, 20.35% Native American, 2.66% Asian, 0.04% Pacific Islander, 0.13% from other races, and 0.44% from two or more races. Hispanic or Latino of any race were 0.35% of the population.

In 2006, the State of North Carolina Department of Public Safety opened the Bertie Correctional Institution on Cooper Hill Road near Windsor. BCI is a close-security prison with the capacity to house up to 1,504 inmates. The new prisoners contributed to the sudden growth in Windsor's population between the 2000 and 2010 census.

There were 938 households, out of which 28.5% had children under the age of 18 living with them, 42.2% were married couples living together, 20.3% had a female householder with no husband present, and 35.5% were non-families. 33.8% of all households were made up of individuals, and 17.0% had someone living alone who was 65 years of age or older. The average household size was 2.33 and the average family size was 2.96.

In the town, the population was spread out, with 24.8% under the age of 18, 5.5% from 18 to 24, 24.1% from 25 to 44, 24.1% from 45 to 64, and 21.4% who were 65 years of age or older. The median age was 42 years. For every 100 females, there were 75.9 males. For every 100 females age 18 and over, there were 69.9 males.

The median income for a household in the town was $25,256, and the median income for a family was $34,107. Males had a median income of $30,045 versus $20,885 for females. The per capita income for the town was $18,006. About 19.9% of families and 25.8% of the population were below the poverty line, including 35.1% of those under age 18 and 25.4% of those age 65 or over.

Notable people
 Frank Ballance (1942–2019), Democratic member of the United States House of Representatives
 Marilyn Mejorado, Tribal chair of the Southern Band Tuscarora Tribe, author
 Kent Bazemore (born 1989), NBA player for the Atlanta Hawks
 William Blount (1749–1800), delegate to the Philadelphia Convention and Senator for Tennessee who was expelled from the Senate
 Norma Bonniwell King (1877–1961), architect
 David Outlaw (1806–1868), Whig member of the United States House of Representatives
 George Outlaw (1771–1825), member of the United States House of Representatives
 Bosh Pritchard (1919–1996), NFL halfback
 Jethro Pugh (1944–2015), NFL defensive tackle for the Dallas Cowboys
 Tootie Robbins (1958–2020), NFL offensive tackle
 Francis D. Winston (1857–1941), North Carolina Lt. Governor and judge
 George T. Winston (1852–1932), educator and university administrator, brother to Francis

Education
 Bertie High School
 Bertie STEM High School
 Bertie Early College High School
Heritage Collegiate Academy

References

External links
 
 —a documentary film about an education project in Bertie County, taking place mostly in Windsor

County seats in North Carolina
Towns in Bertie County, North Carolina
Towns in North Carolina
Historic Albemarle Tour